The 2019 Malaysia Open (officially known as the Celcom Axiata Malaysia Open 2019 for sponsorship reasons) was a badminton tournament which took place at Axiata Arena in Malaysia from 2 to 7 April 2019 and had a total purse of $700,000.

Tournament
The 2019 Malaysia Open was the ninth tournament of the 2019 BWF World Tour and also part of the Malaysia Open championships, which had been held since 1937. This tournament was organized by the Badminton Association of Malaysia with sanction from the BWF.

Venue
This international tournament was held at Axiata Arena in Kuala Lumpur, Malaysia.

Point distribution
Below is the point distribution table for each phase of the tournament based on the BWF points system for the BWF World Tour Super 750 event.

Prize money
The total prize money for this tournament was US$700,000. Distribution of prize money was in accordance with BWF regulations.

Men's singles

Seeds

 Kento Momota (second round)
 Shi Yuqi (semi-finals)
 Chou Tien-chen (first round)
 Chen Long (final)
 Son Wan-ho (withdrew)
 Viktor Axelsen (quarter-finals)
 Anthony Sinisuka Ginting (first round)
 Srikanth Kidambi (quarter-finals)

Finals

Top half

Section 1

Section 2

Bottom half

Section 3

Section 4

Women's singles

Seeds

 Tai Tzu-ying (champion)
 Nozomi Okuhara (semi-finals)
 Chen Yufei (semi-finals)
 Akane Yamaguchi (final)
 P. V. Sindhu (second round) 
 He Bingjiao (quarter-finals)
 Ratchanok Intanon (quarter-finals)
 Saina Nehwal (first round)

Finals

Top half

Section 1

Section 2

Bottom half

Section 3

Section 4

Men's doubles

Seeds

 Marcus Fernaldi Gideon / Kevin Sanjaya Sukamuljo (quarter-finals)
 Li Junhui / Liu Yuchen (champions)
 Takeshi Kamura / Keigo Sonoda (final)
 Hiroyuki Endo / Yuta Watanabe (first round)
 Kim Astrup / Anders Skaarup Rasmussen (first round)
 Mohammad Ahsan / Hendra Setiawan (quarter-finals)
 Han Chengkai / Zhou Haodong (quarter-finals)
 Fajar Alfian / Muhammad Rian Ardianto (semi-finals)

Finals

Top half

Section 1

Section 2

Bottom half

Section 3

Section 4

Women's doubles

Seeds

 Yuki Fukushima / Sayaka Hirota (quarter-finals)
 Misaki Matsutomo / Ayaka Takahashi (second round)
 Mayu Matsumoto / Wakana Nagahara (quarter-finals)
 Greysia Polii / Apriyani Rahayu (second round)
 Chen Qingchen / Jia Yifan (champions)
 Shiho Tanaka / Koharu Yonemoto (first round)
 Gabriela Stoeva / Stefani Stoeva (withdrew)
 Jongkolphan Kititharakul / Rawinda Prajongjai (semi-finals)

Finals

Top half

Section 1

Section 2

Bottom half

Section 3

Section 4

Mixed doubles

Seeds

 Zheng Siwei / Huang Yaqiong (champions)
 Wang Yilyu / Huang Dongping (final)
 Yuta Watanabe / Arisa Higashino (first round)
 Dechapol Puavaranukroh / Sapsiree Taerattanachai (semi-finals)
 Chan Peng Soon / Goh Liu Ying (quarter-finals)
 Chris Adcock / Gabby Adcock (withdrew)
 Tang Chun Man / Tse Ying Suet (first round)
 Hafiz Faizal / Gloria Emanuelle Widjaja (second round)

Finals

Top half

Section 1

Section 2

Bottom half

Section 3

Section 4

References

External links
 Tournament Link

Malaysia Open (badminton)
Malaysia Open
Malaysia Open
Malaysia